Cecil J. Edmonds (26 October 1889 – 11 June 1979) was a British political officer who served with the British Expeditionary Forces in Mesopotamia and Norperforce in north-western Persia, and later in the civil administration of Iraq.

Early life
Cecil was the son of Missionary Rev. Walter and Laura Edmond and was born and raised in Japan until the age of eight. He received an education at Bedford School and Christ's Hospital before going on to Pembroke College, Cambridge.

From 1935 to 1945 he was adviser to the Ministry of Interior in Iraq. Edmonds recorded down his observations and experiences as a political officer in Iraqi Kurdistan between 1920 and 1925 in his famous book Kurds, Turks, and Arabs: Politics, Travel and Research in North-Eastern Iraq, 1919-1925, which provides detailed notes on social and political conditions, personalities and local practices in the districts where he served.

Edmonds showed great interest in the various heterodox religious communities that he had encountered while serving in Kurdistan. Trained as an Orientalist, he had become acquainted with the Kurds when serving the British Administration of Iraq.

References

Bibliography
Cecil J. Edmonds, Kurds, Turks and Arabs: Politics, Travel and Research in North-Eastern Iraq, 1919-1925, London, 1957.

External links
The Kurdish Question

British diplomats
British colonial governors and administrators in Asia
British orientalists
20th-century British writers
1889 births
British colonial political officers
Linguists from the United Kingdom
20th-century British diplomats
1979 deaths
People educated at Bedford School
Alumni of Pembroke College, Cambridge
Mandatory Iraq people
20th-century linguists
Kurdologists